Georgian is the most widely spoken Kartvelian language, and serves as the literary language or lingua franca for speakers of related languages. It is the official language of Georgia and the native or primary language of 87.6% of its population. Its speakers today number approximately four million.

Classification
No claimed genetic links between the Kartvelian languages and any other language family in the world are accepted in mainstream linguistics. Among the Kartvelian languages, Georgian is most closely related to the so-called Zan languages (Megrelian and Laz); glottochronological studies indicate that it split from the latter approximately 2700 years ago. Svan is a more distant relative that split off much earlier, perhaps 4000 years ago.

Dialects

Standard Georgian is largely based on the Kartlian dialect. Over the centuries it has exerted a strong influence on the other dialects, as a result of which they are all, for the most part, mutually intelligible with it and with each other.

History

The history of the Georgian language is conventionally divided into the following phases:
 Early Old Georgian: 300 BC
 Classical Old Georgian: 9th–11th centuries
 Middle Georgian: 11th/12th–17th/18th centuries
 Modern Georgian: 17th/18th century–present

The earliest extant references to Georgian are found in the writings of Marcus Cornelius Fronto, a Roman grammarian from the 2nd century AD. The first direct attestations of the language are inscriptions and palimpsests dating to the 5th century, and the oldest surviving literary work is the 5th century Martyrdom of the Holy Queen Shushanik by Iakob Tsurtaveli.

The emergence of Georgian as a written language appears to have been the result of the Christianization of Georgia in the mid-4th century, which led to the replacement of Aramaic as the literary language.

By the 11th century, Old Georgian had developed into Middle Georgian. The most famous work of this period is the epic poem The Knight in the Panther's Skin, written by Shota Rustaveli in the 12th century.

In 1629 a certain Nikoloz Cholokashvili authored the first printed books written (partially) in Georgian, the Alphabetum Ibericum sive Georgianum cum Oratione and the Dittionario giorgiano e italiano. These were meant to help western Catholic missionaries learn Georgian for evangelical purposes.

Phonology

Consonants
On the left are IPA symbols, and on the right are the corresponding letters of the modern Georgian alphabet, which is essentially phonemic.

 Opinions differ on how to classify // and //;  classifies them as post-velar,  argues that they range from velar to uvular according to context.
 The uvular ejective stop is commonly realised as an uvular ejective fricative [] but it can also be [], [], or [], they are in free variation.
 // is realised as an alveolar tap []  though [] occurs in free variation.
 // is pronounced as velarized [] before back vowels, it is pronounced as [] in the environment of front vowels.
 // has the following allophones. 
 word-initially, intervocally and word-finally it is realized as a bilabial fricative [] or [].
 before voiceless consonants it is realized as [] or [].
 post-consonantally it is realized as [] labialization on preceding consonants.
In initial positions, /b d ɡ/ are pronounced as weakly voiced [b̥ , d̥ , ɡ̊]
in Word-final position, /b, d, ɡ/ are devoiced to [pʰ, tʰ, kʰ].

The glottalization of the ejectives is rather light, and in many romanization systems it is not marked, for transcriptions such as ejective p, t, ts, ch, k and q, against aspirated p‘, t‘, ts‘, ch‘ and k‘ (as in transcriptions of Armenian).

The coronal occlusives (not necessarily affricates) are variously described as apical dental, laminal alveolar, and "dental".

Vowels

Per Canepari, the main realizations of the vowels are [], [], [], [], [].

Aronson describes their realizations as [i̞], [], [] (but "slightly fronted"), [], [u̞].

Shosted transcribed one speaker's pronunciation more-or-less consistently with [], [], [], [], [].

Prosody
Prosody in Georgian involves stress, intonation, and rhythm.  Stress is very weak, and linguists disagree as to where stress occurs in words.  Jun, Vicenik, and Lofstedt have proposed that Georgian stress and intonation are the result of pitch accents on the first syllable of a word and near the end of a phrase.

Phonotactics
Georgian contains many "harmonic clusters" involving two consonants of a similar type (voiced, aspirated, or ejective) that are pronounced with only a single release; e.g.  bgera (sound),  tskhovreba (life), and  ts'q'ali (water). There are also frequent consonant clusters, sometimes involving more than six consonants in a row, as may be seen in words like  gvprtskvni ("you peel us") and  mts'vrtneli ("trainer").

Vicenik has observed that Georgian vowels following ejective stops have creaky voice and suggests this may be one cue distinguishing ejectives from their aspirated and voiced counterparts.

Writing system 

Georgian has been written in a variety of scripts over its history. Currently the Mkhedruli script is almost completely dominant; the others are used mostly in religious documents and architecture.

Mkhedruli has 33 letters in common use; a half dozen more are obsolete in Georgian, though still used in other alphabets, like Mingrelian, Laz, and Svan. The letters of Mkhedruli correspond closely to the phonemes of the Georgian language.

According to the traditional account written down by Leonti Mroveli in the 11th century, the first Georgian script was created by the first ruler of the Kingdom of Iberia, Pharnavaz, in the 3rd century BC. The first examples of a Georgian script date from the 5th century AD. There are now three Georgian scripts, called Asomtavruli "capitals", Nuskhuri "small letters", and Mkhedruli. The first two are used together as upper and lower case in the writings of the Georgian Orthodox Church and together are called Khutsuri "priests' [alphabet]".

In Mkhedruli, there is no case. Sometimes, however, a capital-like effect, called Mtavruli, "title" or "heading", is achieved by modifying the letters so that their vertical sizes are identical and they rest on the baseline with no descenders. These capital-like letters are often used in page headings, chapter titles, monumental inscriptions, and the like.

Keyboard layout 

This is the Georgian standard keyboard layout. The standard Windows keyboard is essentially that of manual typewriters.

Grammar

Morphology
Georgian is an agglutinative language. There are certain prefixes and suffixes that are joined together in order to build a verb. In some cases, there can be up to eight different morphemes in one verb at the same time. An example is ageshenebinat ("you (pl.) should have built (it)"). The verb can be broken down to parts: a-g-e-shen-eb-in-a-t. Each morpheme here contributes to the meaning of the verb tense or the person who has performed the verb. The verb conjugation also exhibits polypersonalism; a verb may potentially include morphemes representing both the subject and the object.

Morphophonology
In Georgian morphophonology, syncope is a common phenomenon. When a suffix (especially the plural suffix -eb-) is attached to a word that has either of the vowels a or e in the last syllable, this vowel is, in most words, lost. For example, megobari means "friend". To say "friends", one says megobrebi (megobØrebi), with the loss of a in the last syllable of the word stem.

Inflection
Georgian has seven noun cases: nominative, ergative, dative, genitive, instrumental, adverbial and vocative. An interesting feature of Georgian is that, while the subject of a sentence is generally in the nominative case and the object is in the accusative case (or dative), one can find this reversed in many situations (this depends mainly on the character of the verb). This is called the dative construction. In the past tense of the transitive verbs, and in the present tense of the verb "to know", the subject is in the ergative case.

Syntax
 Georgian is a left-branching language, in which adjectives precede nouns, possessors precede possessions, objects normally precede verbs, and postpositions are used instead of prepositions.
 Each postposition (whether a suffix or a separate word) requires the modified noun to be in a specific case. This is similar to the way prepositions govern specific cases in many Indo-European languages such as German, Latin, or Russian.
 Georgian is a pro-drop language; both subject and object pronouns are frequently omitted except for emphasis or to resolve ambiguity.
 A study by Skopeteas et al. concluded that Georgian word order tends to place the focus of a sentence immediately before the verb, and the topic before the focus.  A subject–object–verb (SOV) word order is common in idiomatic expressions and when the focus of a sentence is on the object.  A subject–verb–object (SVO) word order is common when the focus is on the subject, or in longer sentences.  Object-initial word orders (OSV or OVS) are also possible, but less common.  Verb-initial word orders including both subject and object (VSO or VOS) are extremely rare.
 Georgian has no grammatical gender; even the pronouns are ungendered.
 Georgian has no articles. Therefore, for example, "guest", "a guest" and "the guest" are said in the same way. In relative clauses, however, it is possible to establish the meaning of the definite article through use of some particles.

Vocabulary

Georgian has a rich word-derivation system. By using a root, and adding some definite prefixes and suffixes, one can derive many nouns and adjectives from the root. For example, from the root -kart-, the following words can be derived: Kartveli (a Georgian person), Kartuli (the Georgian language) and Sakartvelo (Georgia).

Most Georgian surnames end in -dze ("son") (Western Georgia), -shvili ("child") (Eastern Georgia), -ia (Western Georgia, Samegrelo), -ani (Western Georgia, Svaneti), -uri (Eastern Georgia), etc.  The ending -eli is a particle of nobility, comparable to French de, German von or Polish -ski.

Georgian has a vigesimal numeric system like Basque or (partially) French.  Numbers greater than 20 and less than 100 are described as the sum of the greatest possible multiple of 20 plus the remainder. For example, "93" literally translates as "four times twenty plus thirteen" ( - otkhmotsdatsamet'i).

One of the most important Georgian dictionaries is the Explanatory dictionary of the Georgian language. It consists of eight volumes and about 115,000 words. It was produced between 1950 and 1964, by a team of linguists under the direction of Arnold Chikobava.

Examples

Word formations
Georgian has a word derivation system, which allows the derivation of nouns from verb roots both with prefixes and suffixes, for example:

 From the root -- ("write"), the words  ("letter") and mts'erali ("writer") are derived.
 From the root -- ("give"), the word  ("broadcast") is derived.
 From the root -- ("try"), the word  ("exam") is derived.
 From the root -- ("resemble"), the words  ("similar") and msgavseba ("similarity") are derived.
 From the root -- ("build"), the word  ("building") is derived.
 From the root -- ("bake"), the word  ("cake") is derived.
 From the root -- ("cold"), the word  ("refrigerator") is derived.

It is also possible to derive verbs from nouns:

 From the noun -- ("war"), the verb  ("wage war") is derived.
 From the noun -- ("lunch"), the verb  ("eat lunch") is derived.
 From the noun - ("breakfast"), the verb  ("eat a little breakfast") is derived; the preverb ts'a- in Georgian could add the meaning "VERBing a little".
 From the noun -- ("home"), the verb  (the infinite form of the verb "to relocate, to move") is derived.

Likewise, verbs can be derived from adjectives, for example:

 From the adjective -- ("red"), the verb  (the infinite form of both "to blush" and "to make one blush") is derived. This kind of derivation can be done with many adjectives in Georgian.
 From the adjective - ("blind"), the verbs  (the infinite form of both "to become blind" and "to blind someone") are derived.
 From the adjective -- ("beautiful"), the verb  (the infinite form of the verb "to become beautiful") is derived.

Words that begin with multiple consonants
In Georgian many nouns and adjectives begin with two or more contiguous consonants. This is because syllables in the language often begin with two consonants. Recordings are available on the relevant Wiktionary entries, linked to below.
Some examples of words that begin with two consonants are:
 , "water"
 , "correct"
 , "milk"
 , "hair"
 , "mountain"
 , "horse"
 There are also many words that begin with three contiguous consonants:
 , "you (plural)"
 , "green"
 , "nose"
 , "sweet"
 , "painful"
 , "north"
 There are also a few words in Georgian that begin with four contiguous consonants. Examples are:
 , "murderer"
 , "dead"
 , "drunk"
 , "row, screeve"
 There can also be some extreme cases in Georgian. For example, the following word begins with six contiguous consonants:
 , "trainer"
While the following word begins with seven:
, "you train us"
 And the following words begin with eight:
 , "you peel us"
 , "you tear us"

Language example

Article 1 of the Universal Declaration of Human Rights in Georgian:

 Transliteration:
.
 Translation:
All human beings are born free and equal in dignity and rights. They are endowed with reason and conscience and should act towards one another in a spirit of brotherhood.

See also
 Old Georgian
 Georgian dialects
 Georgian alphabet
 Georgian calligraphy
 Georgian calendar
 Georgian grammar
 Georgian numerals
 Georgian profanity

References

Bibliography
 
 
 Elene Machavariani. The graphical basis of the Georgian Alphabet, Tbilisi, 1982, 107 pp (in Georgian, French summary)
 Farshid Delshad. Georgica et Irano-Semitica Studies on Iranian, Semitic and Georgian Linguistics, Wiesbaden 2010, 401 pp  (in German, English, Russian and Georgian summary)
 "Great discovery" (about the expedition of Academician Levan Chilashvili).- Newspaper Kviris Palitra, Tbilisi, April 21–27, 2003 (in Georgian)
 
 
 

 Ivane Javakhishvili. Georgian Paleography, Tbilisi, 1949, 500 pp (in Georgian)
 
 
 Korneli Danelia, Zurab Sarjveladze. Questions of Georgian Paleography, Tbilisi, 1997, 150 pp (in Georgian, English summary)
 
 Pavle Ingorokva. Georgian inscriptions of antique.- Bulletin of ENIMK, vol. X, Tbilisi, 1941, pp. 411–427 (in Georgian)
 
 
 Ramaz Pataridze. The Georgian Asomtavruli, Tbilisi, 1980, 600 pp. (in Georgian).
 
 
 
 
 Zaza Aleksidze. Epistoleta Tsigni, Tbilisi, 1968, 150 pp (in Georgian)
 Butskhrikidze, Marika (2002). The consonant phonotactics of Georgian

External links

Grammars
 Reference grammar of Georgian by Howard Aronson (SEELRC, Duke University)
 Georgian Grammar

Dictionaries
 Georgian English, English Georgian online dictionary
 English-Georgian, German-Georgian and Russian-Georgian dictionaries
 English-Georgian HTML Dictionary
 Georgian Swadesh list of basic vocabulary words (from Wiktionary's Swadesh-list appendix)
Georgian Verb Conjugator/Dictionary

Software
 Georgian fonts, compliant with Unicode 4.0, also available for MAC OS 9 or X
 A keyboard for typing georgian characters for firefox
 Learn Georgian Alphabet Now app Gives the name, pronunciation of each letter, and example words. Shows the stroke order of each letter. Permits drawing practice and has a quiz to learn the letters.

Literature and culture
 About Georgia - Language and Alphabet
 Summer School of Georgian at Tbilisi State University
 Learn how to write Georgian hand-written letters correctly

 
Languages attested from the 5th century
Kartvelian languages
Languages of Georgia (country)
Languages of Abkhazia
Languages of Russia
Languages of Turkey
Languages of Azerbaijan
Languages of Iran
Agglutinative languages
Georgian-Zan languages